Eine Insel namens Udo is a 2011 German comedy film directed by Markus Sehr.

Plot 
Udo has a problem, he suffers from "difficult visibility". His fellow human beings do not notice him, overlook him and only notice him when he addresses them directly. That's why he lives in a tent in the trekking department in a department store where he works as a shop detective. The only person in his life is the transsexual perfume seller Amanda.

His life gets completely mixed up when Jasmin speaks to him in the department store. She can see him. Udo is overjoyed. A love relationship develops between the two, in which Jasmin is surprised several times why the most curious things happen to her companion. The door is thrown in front of him, he gets Frisbee slices on his head and is hit by a car. Udo has to come out and confess to Jasmine that only she can see him.

Everything changes after the first love night together - Udo's first ever. He climbs naked from his tent in the department store, walks past customers and imagines himself invisible. But that's not the case - not anymore.

Suddenly Jasmine is not happy with Udo's abnormal nature. He tries to change, which upsets Jasmin even more. A dispute arises. Jasmin wishes that Udo is invisible again, whereupon he actually becomes invisible again, even for Jasmin. Jasmin is offered a job in Munich, which she accepts. To do this, she now wants to fly to Munich with her boss in a private plane. At the airport, Udo can stop the plane at the last second. Jasmine and Udo kiss. Happy end.

Cast 
 Kurt Krömer as Udo Gries
 Fritzi Haberlandt as Jasmin Kolbach
 Bernd Moss as Amanda
 Kari Ketonen as Sallinen
 Maja Beckmann as Nicki
 Jan-Gregor Kremp as Herr Weber
 Christopher Becker as the waving man
 Rolf Berg as receptionist 
 Piet Fuchs as man with cowboy hat
 Johanna Gastdorf as Frau Weber
 Markus Klauk as Tour de France guy
 Petra Nadolny as Rich thief

External links
 

2011 films
2010s German-language films
German comedy films
2011 comedy films
2010s German films
Films produced by Sönke Wortmann